The 19th Goya Awards took place in Madrid, Spain on 30 January 2005.

The Sea Inside was nominated for 15 awards and won 14, including the four regular acting awards (Bardem, Bugallo, Dueñas and Rivera) and the two acting awards for Best New Actor and Actress, Best Director (Amenábar), Best Film and Best Original Screenplay (Amenábar and Gil).

Winners and nominees

Major award nominees

Other award nominees

Honorary Goya
 José Luis López Vázquez

References

19
2004 film awards
2004 in Spanish cinema
2005 in Madrid